David Arshakyan (born 16 August 1994) is an Armenian footballer. He also holds Russian citizenship as David Rudolfovich Arshakyan.

Club career

FC Mika 
Arshakyan began his professional career with Armenian side FC Mika in 2012, and made three Armenian Premier League appearances as his side captured the 2012–13 Armenian Supercup.

FK Trakai 
Arshakyan was transferred to Lithuanian side FK Trakai prior to the start of the 2015 season. In 34 A Lyga appearances, Arshakyan scored 25 goals and had six multi-goal games, including three hat-tricks, finishing the season just three goals shy of the top scorer in the league. That season, he also appeared in six UEFA Europa League qualifiers, scoring five goals in total.

Arshakyan made 18 appearances for Trakai in the 2016 season, scoring nine goals, including a hat-trick over FK Utenis Utena on July 28.

Chicago Fire 
On August 3, 2016, the Chicago Fire announced that they had acquired Arshakyan from FK Trakai, on a two-year contract with club options for the third and fourth years. Arshakyan made his Chicago Fire debut on August 27, 2016, in a 6–2 defeat against D.C. United, when he replaced striker Michael de Leeuw in the 56th minute. 

On December 18, 2017, Chicago and Arshakayan mutually agreed to terminate his contract.

Vejle Boldklub 
On January 26, 2018, the Danish club Vejle Boldklub announced that they had signed Arshakyan on a free transfer. He signed a contract until the summer 2020.

Irtysh Omsk
On 23 September 2020, Arshakyan signed for Irtysh Omsk. On 31 March 2021, his contract with Irtysh was terminated by mutual consent.

International career 
As a youth player, Arshakyan represented Armenia at the U-19 and U-21 levels. In August 2016 Arshakyan was called up to the senior team ahead of its first match of 2018 FIFA World Cup qualification.  On 4 September 2016  he debuted for the senior team, starting in Armenia's qualification match against Denmark.

Career statistics

References

External links 
 

1994 births
Living people
Footballers from Saint Petersburg
Armenian footballers
Armenia international footballers
Russian footballers
Association football forwards
Armenian expatriate footballers
FC Mika players
FK Riteriai players
Chicago Fire FC players
HNK Gorica players
FC Fakel Voronezh players
FC Ararat Yerevan players
NK Rudeš players
FC Irtysh Omsk players
A Lyga players
Major League Soccer players
Croatian Football League players
Armenian Premier League players
Danish 1st Division players
Russian First League players
Armenia under-21 international footballers
Russian people of Armenian descent
Citizens of Armenia through descent
Expatriate footballers in Lithuania
Expatriate footballers in Croatia
Expatriate men's footballers in Denmark
Armenian expatriate sportspeople in Lithuania
Armenian expatriates in Croatia
Armenian expatriates in Denmark